Spotty may refer to:

 Sharptooth houndshark, Triakis megalopterus
 Australian spotted mackerel, Scomberomorus munroi
 Spotty (fish), Notolabrus celidotus
 Superted's sidekick
 Spotty (Pillow Pal), a Pillow Pal Dalmatian made by Ty, Inc.
 A schoolboy from the comic strip "Bash Street Kids"
 Algernon "Spotty" Perkins, a character in the comic strip "Dennis the Menace (UK)"